Borg (previously called Attic) is deduplicating backup software for various Unix-like operating systems.

History 

Attic development began in 2010 and was accepted to Debian in August 2013. Attic is available from pip and notably part of Debian, Ubuntu, Arch and Slackware.

In 2015, Attic was forked as "Borg" to support a "more open, faster paced development", according to its developers. Many issues in Attic have been fixed in this fork, but backward compatibility with the original program has been lost (a non-reversible upgrade process exists). Borg 1.0.0 was released on 5 March 2016, Borg 1.1.0 was released on 7 October 2017.

As of 2018, Borg is under active development by many contributors, while Attic is not being developed.Stable releases are available from various Linux distributions such as Debian, Ubuntu, Fedora, OpenSUSE and others, from the ports collection of various BSD derivatives and from brew for macOS. The project provides pre-built binaries for Linux, FreeBSD and macOS.

As of April 2021, the attic website was removed.

Design 
Borg offers efficient, deduplicated, compressed and (optionally) encrypted and authenticated backups.

A backup includes metadata like owner/group, permissions, POSIX ACLs and Extended file attributes.
It handles special files also - like hardlinks, symlinks, devices files, etc. Internally it represents the files in an archive as a stream of metadata, similar to tar and unlike tools such as git. The Borg project has created extensive documentation of the internal workings.

It uses a rolling hash to implement global data deduplication.
Compression defaults to zlib, encryption is AES (via OpenSSL) authenticated by a HMAC.

See also 
 List of backup software
 Comparison of backup software

References

External links 
  
 BorgBackup

2010 software
Backup software for Linux
Free backup software
Python (programming language) software
Software using the BSD license